Chase Strangio (born October 29, 1982) is an American lawyer and transgender rights activist. He is the Deputy Director for Transgender Justice and staff attorney with the American Civil Liberties Union (ACLU).

Early life and education
Strangio grew up near Boston, Massachusetts.

Strangio attended Grinnell College, graduating in 2004. After graduation, he worked as a paralegal at GLBTQ Legal Advocates & Defenders (GLAD).  He went on to attend Northeastern University School of Law. Strangio came out as a transgender man while in law school.

After graduating from Northeastern in 2010, Strangio received a fellowship from the Sylvia Rivera Law Project (SRLP) to continue developing his legal skills.

Career and activism
After law school, Strangio worked as a public defender for Dean Spade, the first openly trans law professor in the U.S. Spade's work had inspired Strangio while he was in college.

In 2012, Strangio and trans activist Lorena Borjas founded the Lorena Borjas Community Fund to provide bail and bond assistance to trans people.

In 2013, Strangio began working for the ACLU. Strangio served as lead counsel for the ACLU team representing transgender U.S. Army soldier Chelsea Manning. He was also part of the team suing on behalf of trans student Gavin Grimm, who was denied access to the boys' restrooms at his school.

In October 2019, Strangio was one of the lawyers representing Aimee Stephens, a trans woman who was fired from her job at a funeral home, in the U.S. Supreme Court case R.G. & G.R. Harris Funeral Homes Inc. v. Equal Employment Opportunity Commission. The previous month, trans actress Laverne Cox brought Strangio as her date to the 2019 Emmy Awards, and the pair spoke to reporters on the red carpet about the upcoming court case.

In June 2020, the U.S. Supreme Court decided 6–3 in favor of Gerald Bostock, a gay man terminated from his job due to discrimination on the basis of sexual orientation, in Bostock v. Clayton County. Strangio was one of the lawyers on the case. The court ruled that it is illegal to discriminate in employment on the basis of transgender identity or sexual orientation.

In November 2020, journalist Glenn Greenwald criticized Strangio's comments about the book Irreversible Damage: The Transgender Craze Seducing Our Daughters by Abigail Shrier. Strangio, who had tweeted that "stopping the circulation of this book and these ideas is 100% a hill I will die on," responded that he was not speaking for the ACLU and said he deleted his tweet because "there were relentless calls to have me fired, which I found exhausting as I was navigating work and childcare."

Strangio has appeared on television programs including The Rachel Maddow Show, Democracy Now!, For the Record with Greta, AM Joy, PBS NewsHour, and Up.

In 2021 and 2022, Chase worked with the ACLU to fight against state legislation seeking to prohibit children from accessing treatment for gender transition.

Honors and recognition
In 2014, Strangio was named to the Trans 100 list for "outstanding contributions to the trans community".

In June 2017, Strangio was one of those chosen for NBC Out's inaugural "#Pride30" list.

In May 2018, Strangio was awarded an honorary Doctor of Laws by his alma mater Grinnell College.

In November 2019, he was awarded the American Bar Association's Commission on Sexual Orientation and Gender Identity's 2020 Stonewall Award.

Strangio was included in 2020's Time 100 most influential people in the world.

Personal life
His partner is the art curator and writer Kimberly Drew. Strangio lives in New York City and is co-parenting his child.

References

Further reading
 Gessen, Masha.

External links 
 Chase Strangio ACLU staff page
 
 

Living people
1982 births
American Civil Liberties Union people
Grinnell College alumni
Lawyers from Boston
LGBT lawyers
American LGBT rights activists
Northeastern University School of Law alumni
Transgender men
Transgender rights activists
LGBT people from Massachusetts
21st-century American LGBT people
Activists from Boston